Africallagma cuneistigma is a species of damselfly in the family Coenagrionidae. It is endemic to Zimbabwe.  Its natural habitats are subtropical or tropical moist montane forests and rivers. It is threatened by habitat loss.

References 

Coenagrionidae
Endemic fauna of Zimbabwe
Odonata of Africa
Vulnerable animals
Vulnerable biota of Africa
Insects described in 1969
Taxonomy articles created by Polbot